The Australian island state of Tasmania has been omitted from maps of Australia over time. Such omissions often provoke outrage from Tasmanians, or amusement on mainland Australia.

Early omissions 

In 1909, the Daily Post of Hobart reported that "very often maps of the Commonwealth... are not graced with the fair island of Tasmania depicted on them."

1982 Commonwealth Games
During the 1982 Commonwealth Games opening ceremony, performers created a map of Australia that omitted Tasmania. Tasmanian poet Andrew Sant wrote "Off the Map" in response:

Identity deleted,
Close to the Continent
Who wouldn't make a fuss?
There have been wars for less...

2014 Commonwealth Games
The Australian swim team at the 2014 Commonwealth Games were issued training swimsuits with a stylised design featuring maps of Australia, along with kangaroos and emus. The animals obscured Tasmania, and the design was criticized for leaving Tasmania off the map. Tasmanian Premier Will Hodgman called the omission "un-Australian and unforgivable".

Other incidents

Australian athletes at the 1956 Summer Olympics, held in Melbourne, wore tracksuits that featured a map of Australia excluding Tasmania.
In 2000 the island was left off the Australian map in some of the official literature for the Sydney Olympics.
Tasmania was omitted from the map of Australia shown on some promotional posters of the 2008 film Australia.
In 2012, Arnott's Biscuits produced a biscuit in the shape of mainland Australia.
In 2013, South Australia adopted a logo that omitted Tasmania.
In 2016, Woolworths Supermarkets were forced to withdraw Australia Day caps from sale which featured a map of Australia without Tasmania.
In 2019 Thins Crisps released a Pie & Sauce flavour crisps which had a map of Australia with Tasmania omitted on the package.
Many editions of the board game Risk do not include Tasmania or New Zealand.

See also
 Omission of New Zealand from maps

References

Tasmania
World maps
Tasmania
History of Tasmania